Siobhán Mary Ann McCarthy (born 6 November 1957 in Dublin) is a television and stage actress.

Career

McCarthy portrays Roisin Connor in ITV1's Prison drama Bad Girls. Her other television credits include Lovejoy, The Big Battalions and Holby City.

McCarthy originated the roles of the Mistress in Evita in 1978 in London's West End, before later returning to the show to play the title role. In between, Siobhan joined the vocal harmony group Wall Street Crash  (1980–1983) where she performed several times at London's Talk of the Town, at the Casino in Monte Carlo, and in two Royal Variety Performances (1980 and 1982). She was also the first to play Donna Sheridan in Mamma Mia! in 1999, for which she was nominated for an Olivier Award for Best Actress in a Musical.

Other roles include leads as Mrs. Johnstone in Blood Brothers, Svetlana in the original London production of Chess, Fantine in Les Misérables, Mary Magdalene in Jesus Christ Superstar and Deborah Warner's Medea.

More recently she played the roles of Velma Von Tussle in the London production of Hairspray (February 2010 – March 2010) and Joanne in the Southwark Playhouse revival of Stephen Sondheim's Company.

In 2017 she received a Lucille Lortel Awards Outstanding Lead Actress in a Musical nomination for her performance in the Off-Broadway production of Sweeney Todd: The Demon Barber of Fleet Street.

Personal life
She married the theatrical sound designer Andrew Bruce in 1986 and lives in London with her husband and two children.

Filmography

References

External links

1957 births
Living people
Irish stage actresses
Actresses from Dublin (city)
Irish television actresses